Romas Lileikis is a Lithuanian poet, musician, film director, and the president of The Republic of Užupis

Career 
Lileikis is a director of five movies: Aš esu (I Am) (1990), Olandų gatvė (Dutch Street), Anapus (Beyond) (1995), K+M+B (2001), and Saša (Sasha) (2006), and author (composer and lyricist) of three music albums: Kiaulės sakmė (The Pig's Saga), Evangelija nuo Romo (Gospel of Romas), and Requiem.

Lileikis has also been titled President of Užupio Respublika. Užupio Respublika (Republic of Užupis) is a social and artistic community based in area of Užupis, Vilnius. Užupio Respublika has its own constitution and government. Užupio Respublika has four honorary citizens - Jonas Mekas, Dalai Lama, Ugnė Karvelis, and Zenonas Šteinys. You can meet the President in the legendary Uzhupis cafe in Vilnius, just beyond the bridge on the left.

References

Living people
Lithuanian male poets
Lithuanian film directors
Lithuanian musicians
Micronational leaders
Year of birth missing (living people)